Salilota australis, the Patagonian cod or tadpole codling, is a species of morid cod found in the waters around the southern tip of South America and the Falkland Islands.

References
 

Moridae
Fish of South America
Fish of Argentina
Fish of Chile
Fish described in 1878
Taxa named by Albert Günther